Xi'an, frequently spelled as Xian and also known by other names, is the capital of Shaanxi Province. A sub-provincial city on the Guanzhong Plain, the city is the third most populous city in Western China, after Chongqing and Chengdu, as well as the most populous city in Northwest China. Its total population was 12,952,907 as of the 2020 census. The total urban population was 9.28 million.

Since the 1980s, as part of the economic growth of inland China especially for the central and northwest regions, Xi'an has re-emerged as a cultural, industrial, political and educational centre of the entire central-northwest region, with many facilities for research and development. Xi'an currently holds sub-provincial status, administering 11 districts and 2 counties. In 2020, Xi'an was ranked as a Beta- (global second tier) city by the Globalization and World Cities Research Network, and, according to the country's own ranking, ranked 17th. Xi'an is also one of the world's top 100 financial centers, according to the Global Financial Centres Index. Xi'an is ranked in the top 30 cities in the world by scientific research output as tracked by the Nature Index, and home to multiple China's prestige universities in Northwest China, including Xi'an Jiaotong University, Northwestern Polytechnical University, Xidian University and Northwest University.

Known as Chang'an in much of its history, Xi'an is one of the Chinese Four Great Ancient Capitals, having held the position under several of the most important dynasties in Chinese history, including Western Zhou, Western Han, Sui, Northern Zhou and Tang. Xi'an is now the second most popular tourist destination in China. The city is the starting point of the Silk Road and home to the Terracotta Army of Emperor Qin Shi Huang, both of which are listed as UNESCO World Heritage sites.

Name 
"Xi'an" is the atonal pinyin romanization of the Mandarin pronunciation of its name , which means "Western Peace" in Chinese. The name was adopted in 1369 under the early Ming dynasty. This form still appears in the Latin name of the Catholic diocese of Xi'an, .

The area of present-day Xi'an has been the site of several important former Chinese cities. The capital of the Western Zhou were the twin cities of Feng and Hao, known collectively as Fenghao, located on opposite banks of the Feng River at its confluence with the southern bank of the Wei in the western suburbs of present-day Xi'an. The Qin capital Xianyang was erected north of the Wei during the Warring States period and was succeeded by the Western Han capital of Chang'an, meaning "Perpetual Peace", which was located south of the Wei and covered the central area of present-day Xi'an. During the Eastern Han, Chang'an was also known as Xijing or the "Western Capital", relative to its position to the main capital at Luoyang. Under the Sui, its name became Daxing ("Greatly Prosperous") in AD 581. Under the Tang, the name reverted to Chang'an in 618. Under the Mongolian Yuan dynasty (13th & 14th centuries), it held a succession of names: Fengyuan  Anxi  "Peaceful West") and Jingzhao  The Ming name "Xi'an" was changed back to Xijing ("Western Capital", as above) between 1930 and 1943.

History

Prehistory
A 6,500-year-old Neolithic village, Banpo, was discovered in 1953 on the eastern outskirts of the city proper, which contains the remains of several well organized Neolithic settlements carbon dated to 5,600–6,700 years ago. The site is now home to the Xi'an Banpo Museum, built in 1957 to preserve the archaeological collection.

Ancient era

Xi'an became a cultural and political centre of China in the 11th century BC with the founding of the Zhou dynasty. The capital of Zhou was established in the twin settlements of Fengjing and Haojing, together known as Fenghao, located southwest of contemporary Xi'an. The settlement was also known as Zōngzhōu (宗周) to indicate its role as the capital of the vassal states. In 738 BC, King Ping of Zhou moved the capital to Luoyang due to political unrest.

Imperial era

Following the Warring States period, China was unified under the Qin dynasty (221–206 BC) for the first time, with the capital located at Xianyang, just northwest of modern Xi'an. The first emperor of China, Qin Shi Huang ordered the construction of the Terracotta Army and his mausoleum just to the east of Xi'an almost immediately after his ascension to the throne.

In 202 BC, the founding emperor Liu Bang of the Han dynasty established his capital in Chang'an County; his first palace, Changle Palace ("Perpetual Happiness") was built across the river from the ruin of the Qin capital. This is traditionally regarded as the founding date of Chang'an. Two years later, Liu Bang built Weiyang Palace ("Never Ending Palace") north of modern Xi'an. Weiyang Palace was the largest palace ever built on Earth, covering , which is 6.7 times the size of the current Forbidden City and 11 times the size of the Vatican City. The original Xi'an city wall was started in 194 BC and took 4 years to finish. In the year 190, amidst uprisings and rebellions just prior to the Three Kingdoms Period, a powerful warlord named Dong Zhuo moved the court from Luoyang to Chang'an in a bid to avoid a coalition of other powerful warlords against him.

Following several hundred years of unrest, the Sui dynasty united China again in 582. The emperor of Sui ordered a new capital to be built southeast of the Han capital, called Daxing. It consisted of three sections: the Imperial City, the palace section, and the civilian section, with a total area of  within the city walls. At the time, it was the largest city in the world. The city was renamed Chang'an by the Tang dynasty. In the mid-7th century, after returning from his pilgrimage to India, the Buddhist monk Xuanzang established a translation centre for Sanskrit scriptures.

Construction of the Giant Wild Goose Pagoda began in 652. In 707, construction of the Small Wild Goose Pagoda began.

The Nestorian Stele is a Tang Chinese stele erected in 781 that documents 150 years of early Christianity in China. It is a 279 cm tall limestone block with text in both Chinese and Syriac describing the existence of Christian communities in several cities in northern China. It reveals that the initial Nestorian Christian church had met recognition by the Tang Emperor Taizong, due to efforts of the Christian missionary Alopen in 635.

Chang'an was devastated at the end of the Tang dynasty in 904. Residents were forced to move to the new capital city in Luoyang. Only a small area in the city continued to be occupied thereafter. During the Ming dynasty, a new wall was constructed in 1370 and remains intact to this day.

Modern era

In October 1911, during the Xinhai revolution, revolutionaries stormed the Manchu fort in Xi'an. Most of the city's 20,000 Manchus were killed. The Hui Muslim community was divided in its support for the revolution. The Hui Muslims of Shaanxi supported the revolutionaries, while the Hui Muslims of Gansu supported the Qing. The native Hui Muslims (Mohammedans) of Xi'an (Shaanxi province) joined the Han Chinese revolutionaries in slaughtering the Manchus. Some wealthy Manchus survived by being ransomed. Wealthy Han Chinese enslaved Manchu girls and poor Han Chinese troops seized young Manchu women as wives. Hui Muslims also seized young pretty Manchu girls and raised them as Muslims.

A British missionary who witnessed the massacre commented that "Old and young, men and women, children alike, were all butchered... Houses were plundered and then burnt; those who would fain have laid hidden till the storm was past, were forced to come out into the open. The revolutionaries, protected by a parapet of the wall, poured a heavy, unceasing, relentless fire into the doomed Tartar (Manchu) city, those who tried to escape thence into the Chinese city were cut down as they emerged from the gates."

In 1936, the Xi'an Incident took place inside the city during the Chinese Civil War. The incident brought the Kuomintang (KMT) and Chinese Communist Party to a truce in order to concentrate on fighting against the Japanese Invasion.

On March 11, 1938, an aerial battle broke out for the first time over Xi'an as Imperial Japanese Army Air Force aircraft attacked the city and was engaged by Chinese Air Force I-15 fighter planes led by Lt. Cen Zeliu of the 5th Pursuit Group, 17th Squadron. While repeatedly attacked by air, Shaanxi was heavily fortified by units of the Eighth Route Army; Xi'an was never taken by the Japanese forces.

On May 20, 1949, the Communist-controlled People's Liberation Army captured the city of Xi'an from the Kuomintang force.

Xi'an made headlines for being one of the many cities where the 2012 China anti-Japanese demonstrations occurred.

In 2022, Xi'an witnessed the largest COVID-19 community outbreak since the initial months of the pandemic hit China. From 23 December 2021, the city was put into strict lockdown after local authorities reported more than 250 cases, traced to the Delta variant by authorities. This led to stressed healthcare and delayed or insufficient food deliveries to some part of the city. Restrictions of Xi'an were lifted on January 24.

Geography

Xi'an lies on the Guanzhong Plain in the south-central part of Shaanxi province, on a flood plain created by the eight surrounding rivers and streams.

The city borders the northern foot of the Qin Mountains (Qinling) to the south, and the banks of the Wei River to the north. Not far to the north is the Loess Plateau.

At the beginning of Han dynasty, the Chief of Staff Zhang Liang advised the emperor Liu Bang to choose Guanzhong as the capital of the Han dynasty: "Guanzhong Plain is located behind Mount Xiao and Hangu Pass, and connects Long (Gansu) and Shu (Sichuan). The area can be called an irony castle spreads for thousands of miles, and is rich in harvest like the nation of heaven." Since then, Guanzhong is also known as the 'Nation of the Heaven'.

Climate

Xi'an has a temperate climate that is influenced by the East Asian monsoon, classified under the Köppen climate classification as situated on the borderline between a semi-arid climate (BSk) and humid subtropical climate (Cwa). The Wei River valley is characterised by hot, humid summers, cold, dry winters, and dry springs and autumns. Most of the annual precipitation is delivered from July to late October. Snow occasionally falls in winter but rarely settles for long. Dust storms often occur during March and April as the city rapidly warms up. Summer months also experience frequent but short thunderstorms. With monthly percent possible sunshine ranging from 31 percent in December to 47 percent in August, the city receives 1,536 hours of bright sunshine annually.

National Time Service Center
The Shaanxi Astronomical Observatory was established in 1966. In 1975, according to the Geodetic Origin Report of the People's Republic of China, 'in order to avoid bias in the mensuration as much as possible, the Geodetic Origin would be in central mainland China.' Lintong, a town near Xi'an was chosen. Since 1986, Chinese Standard Time (CST) was set from NTSC. The National Time Service Center (NTSC), the Chinese Academy of Sciences is an institute which is mainly engaged in the service and research on time and frequency. NTSC takes charge of generating and maintaining the national standard time scale, disseminating the time and frequency signals. The autonomous standard time scales of universal time and atomic time and the dissemination techniques with LF radio and HF radio were established successively during the 1970s and 1980s, which meet all the requirements for different applications on the whole, such as the scientific researches, national economy, etc.

Demographics

As of 2010 Xi'an has a population of 5.4 million.
Compared to the census data from 2007, the population has increased by 1.4 million persons. The population is 51.66 percent male and 48.34 percent female. Among its districts, Yanta has the largest population, with around 1.08 million inhabitants.

The Xi'an metropolitan area was estimated by the OECD (Organisation for Economic Co-operation and Development) to have, a population of 12.9 million,  of which 5,740,000 is urban.

Administrative divisions
The sub-provincial city of Xi'an has direct jurisdiction over 11 districts and 2 counties:

Transportation

Xi'an has many areas that are easily accessible on foot. In many commercial, residential, educational zones in the city, especially in the shopping and entertainment districts around the Bell Tower, underpasses and overpasses have been built for the safety and convenience of pedestrians.

A bicycle-sharing network started operating in Xi'an from the year 2013 and today has 52,000 bikes, used by over 200,000 people per day. Taxi services are numerous, but many citizens of Xi'an still commute to work using the city's 270 official municipal bus routes serviced by a fleet of over 7,800 buses, with an average system-wide ridership of over 4 million people per day. The bus network is complemented by a rapidly expanding subway system that carries over 1.5 million commuters per day. There are more than 2 million registered automobiles in Xi'an; the growing number of personal automobiles also means traffic jams are a common urban issue.

Metro

Line 2, running through the city from north (North Railway Station) to south (Weiqu Nan), was the first line opened to the public on September 16, 2011. Operations began on September 28, 2011. Line 1 opened on September 15, 2013. As a west–east railway, its 19 stations connect Houweizhai and Fangzhicheng. Line 3 runs from northeast (Baoshuiqu) to southwest (Yuhuazhai) and opened on November 8, 2016. Line 4, which is basically parallel to Line 2 on its east except for the northern parts, runs from the North Square of the North Railway Station [Beikezhan (Beiguangchang)] to south (Hangtianxincheng) and was available publicly on December 26, 2018. Line 5 opened on December 28, 2020. This line is 41.6 kilometres long with 31 stations from Matengkong to Chuangxingang.

The subway system covers some of the most famous attractions, such as Banpo Museum (Banpo Station, Line 1), Bell and Drum Tower (Line 2), Fortifications of Xi'an (Line 2), the Giant Wild Goose Pagoda (Line 3 and Line 4), the Daminggong National Heritage Park (Line 4) and Shaanxi History Museum (Line 2, 3 and 4), etc.

The first metro departure time for Line 1, 2, 3 and 4 is 6:00, the last metro departure time for Line 3 and 4 is 23:00, for Line 1 is 23:30, and for Line 2 is 23:50.

On December 30, 2008, a fire accident occurred that was extinguished within an hour and all workers evacuated safely. Sixty-six hours later, on January 2, another fire occurred at another station on Line 2.

Rail
Xi'an's railway station, located just north of Xi'an walled city, is one of the eight major national railway stations, and the main railway transportation hub of Shaanxi Province. The new Xi'an North railway station, situated a few miles to the north, is the station for the high-speed trains of the Zhengzhou–Xi'an High-Speed Railway. With 34 platforms, it is the largest railway station in Northwest China. Construction of the station began on September 19, 2008. The station was opened on January 11, 2011. As of May 2012, Xi'an North Station is served only by the fast (G-series and D-series) trains running on the Zhengzhou–Xi'an high-speed railway; one of them continues south to Hankou.
The city's other stations include Xi'an West, Xi'an East, Xi'an South, Sanmincun, and Fangzhicheng railway stations.

It provides 112 services to 80 000 people daily. Among the destinations served by direct trains from Xi'an are Beijing, Zhengzhou, Lanzhou, Baoji, and Mount Hua. China Railway High-speed 2 now run an express services from Xi'an to Baoji and Xi'an to Zhengzhou; with a total running time to Baoji of under 90 minutes, and 2 hours to Zhengzhou. The Zhengzhou–Xi'an high-speed railway also serves Xi'an. Construction work began on September 25, 2005, the railway opened for service on February 6, 2010. The railway has made air service between Zhengzhou and Xi'an uncompetitive. All passenger flights between the two cities were suspended within 48 days of start of regular high-speed rail service.

Air
Xi'an Xianyang International Airport (airport code: XIY) is the major airport serving the city and it is the largest airport in the northwestern part of China. It is 25 miles northwest of Xi'an city centre, and 8 miles northeast of the centre of Xianyang. China Eastern Airlines, Hainan Airlines and China Southern Airlines are the main airlines using the airport. Terminal 3 and the second runway were opened on May 3, 2012.

Other than linking to most Chinese cities, the airport also has flights to several major Asian cities. One incident, however, is in 1994, when China Northwest Airlines flight 2303 broke up in mid-air and crashed near Xi'an, en route to Guangzhou from Xi'an. A maintenance error was responsible. All 160 people on board died. , it remains the deadliest airplane crash ever to occur in mainland China.

Culture and religion

Resident artists
Xi'an is home to contemporary Chinese stars such as Xu Wei, Zhang Chu and Zheng Jun.

Xi'an cuisine

Yangrou paomo (flat bread soaked in lamb soup) is a well known Xi'anese dish.

Liang pi (cold rice noodles; simplified Chinese: 凉皮; traditional Chinese: 涼皮; pinyin: liángpí ) are wheat or rice noodles served cold with vinegar and chili oil.

Biangbiang mian, also known as youpo chemian, are thick and long hand-pulled noodles, typically served with red hot pepper.

Roujiamo (meat buns) is a bun filled with pork.

Qinqiang 
Qinqiang (Voice of Qin) is the oldest and most extensive of the four major types of Chinese opera. Another one would be the Empress of the Great Tang is China's first Tang Dynasty dance and music show. The story is based on the life of the famous Chinese historical figure, Empress Wu Zetian of the Tang Dynasty. Through live performances by a classical Chinese orchestra and state-of-the-art stage design, this show will take you back to the glory of the legendary Empress Wu Zetian and the Great Tang Empire.

Chinese traditional religion and Taoism

The most influential religions in Xi'an are the Chinese traditional religion and Taoist schools, represented by many major and minor temples. Among these there are a City God Temple, completely reconstructed in the 2010s, and a Temple of Confucius.

Christianity

The first recorded Christian missionary in China was Alopen, a Syriac-speaker, who arrived in Xi'an (then known as Chang'an) in 635 along the Silk Road. The Nestorian Stele, now located in Xi'an's Beilin Museum, is a Tang Chinese stele erected in 781 that documents the 150 years of early Christianity in China following Alopen. It is a  limestone block with text in both Chinese and Syriac describing the existence of Christian communities in several cities in northern China. The Daqin Pagoda, a Buddhist pagoda in Zhouzhi County of Xi'an, has been suggested to have originally been a Nestorian Christian church from the Tang Dynasty.

Baptist missionaries from England ran a hospital in Xi'an. In 1892, Arthur Gostick Shorrock and Moir Duncan founded the Sianfu Mission, in present-day Xi'an.

Islam
Xi'an has a large Muslim community, the significant majority are from the Hui group, there are an estimated 50,000 Hui Muslims in Xi'an. There are seven mosques in Xi'an, the best known being the Great Mosque.

Economy

As part of the China Western Development policy, Xi’an became a major target for accelerated attention. From 1997 to 2006, the industrial output value of Xi’an's service industry increased at an annual average rate of 13 percent, compared to traditional service industries of 0.74 percent, representing a growth from US$8.113 billion to US$25.85 billion. Xi'an is the largest economy of the Shaanxi province, with a GDP of 324.1 billion Yuan in 2010. On average this value increases by 14.5 percent annually, and accounts for approximately 41.8 percent of Shaanxi's total GDP. At least fifty-eight countries have established over 2,560 enterprises in Xi'an, including nineteen of the Fortune 500 enterprises. These include ABB, Mitsubishi, Panasonic, Toshiba, Fujitsu, Coca-Cola Company and Boeing.

In 2020, Xi'an was ranked as a Beta- (global second tier) city by the Globalization and World Cities Research Network. Xi'an is also one of the world's top 100 financial centers, according to the Global Financial Centres Index.

Important industries include equipment manufacturing, tourism, and service outsourcing. The manufacturing industry had an annual output of RMB 36.5 billion, accounting for 44.5 percent of the city's total. Furthermore, as one of China's four ancient capitals, Xi'an's many cultural sites, including the Terracotta Army, the City Wall of Xi'an, and the Famen Temple, make tourism an important industry as well. In 2010, 52 million domestic tourists visited Xi'an, earning a total income of RMB 40.52 billion. On average, revenue increases by 36.4 percent per year, and foreign-exchange earnings (530 million in 2009) increase by around 35.8 percent.

Xi'an is also one of the first service outsourcing cities in China, with over 800 corporations in the industry. The city's output value from this sector exceeded RMB 23 billion in 2008. Employment in the sector doubled from 1997 to 2006, from a base of 60,000, and computer consulting also doubled from 16,000 to 32,000. As a result of the importance of the software-outsourcing industry, the city planned construction of a Software New Town, which is scheduled to be completed in 2015 with 30 billion RMB investment. Other major export goods include lighting equipment and automobile parts, while its major import goods are mechanical and electrical products. Internationally, Xi'an's largest trade partner is the United States.

Software and technological industries

The major industrial zone in Xi'an is the Xi'an Economic and Technological Development Zone. The Jiangcungou landfill in Xi'an was China's largest landfill site before its closure in 2019.

The growing economy of the city also supports the development of a software industry, and the city is a pioneer in software industry in China. The Xi'an Software Park within the Xi'an Hi-Tech Industries Development Zone (XDZ) has attracted over 1,085 corporations and 106,000 employees as of 2012. Xi'an is described as having" large pool of cheap human resources from the 100 universities in the area, it hoovers up around 3,000 computer graduates every year, each earning approximately $120 a month—half the wages for the equivalent job in Beijing."

Aerospace industry
In November 2006, Xi'an and the China Aerospace Science and Technology Corporation jointly set up Xi'an Aerospace Science and Technology Industrial Base. From its establishment, the base has focused on the development of the civil space industry, including equipment manufacturing, software and service outsourcing, new materials and solar photovoltaics.

Apart from the core area, the base will cover Xi'an and the Guanzhong area and the expansion zone will reach other parts of Northwest China and Southwest China. It is expected that by 2012 the total industry output can reach 2.8 billion us dollars with about 10 to 20 brand products with intellectual property rights and 5 to 8 products with global competitiveness.

In 2008, after the launch of the initial aerospace centre in Shanghai, the PRC is constructing another civil aerospace centre in the Shaanxi province. The State Development and Reform Commission approved the planning of Xi'an National Civil Aerospace Industrial Base on December 26, 2007. The National Civil Aerospace Industrial Base of Xi'an, set to cover , will focus on developing satellites, new materials, energies, IT and other technologies for civil applications.

Education and research

There are a total of 60 universities in the city, with the most famous one being the Xi'an Jiaotong University, which was ranked 100-150 worldwide. Other ones also include the Northwestern Polytechnical University, Xidian University, Chang'an University, Northwest University, Northwest University of Political Science and Law and; Shaanxi Normal University.

Xi'an is a world leading city for scientific research and as of 2022, it ranked among the world's top 30 cities and China's top 10 cities by scientific research output by the Nature Index. It ranked first in West China region, with a combined population of almost 300 million. The city also hosted the 2011 World Horticultural Exposition.

Tourism

Sites
Because of the city's many historical monuments and a plethora of ancient ruins and tombs in the vicinity, tourism has been an important component of the local economy, and the Xi'an region is one of the most popular tourist destinations in China.

The city has many important historical sites, and some are ongoing archaeological projects, such as the Mausoleum of Qin Shi Huang and his Terracotta Army. There are several burial mounds, tombs of the Zhou dynasty kings located in the city. Xi'an also contains some 800 royal mausoleums and tombs from the Han dynasty, with some of them yielding hundreds of sculpted clay soldiers, and remains of sacrificial temples from the Han era. The city has numerous Tang dynasty pagodas and is noted for its history museum and its stele forest, which is housed in an 11th-century Confucian temple containing large stone tablets from various dynasties.

Some of the most well-known sites in Xi'an are:

The city is surrounded by a well-preserved city wall which was re-constructed in the 14th century during the early Ming dynasty and was based on the inner imperial palace of Tang dynasty.
The Bell Tower and Drum Tower, both are located at the city's central axis.
The city's Muslim Quarter, which is home to the Great Mosque of Xi'an.
The Giant Wild Goose Pagoda and Small Wild Goose Pagoda are both spectacular towers and both are well over 1,000 years old and have survived great earthquakes. 
The Stele Forest is famous for its numerous historic inscriptions and stoneworks
Xi Ming Temple
Wolong Temple at Kaitong lane.
Xingjiao Temple at Shaolin Yuan.
Jianfu Temple
The Banpo Neolithic village.
The Shaanxi History Museum, which has a large collection of historical artifacts. 
Huaqing Hot Springs, at the foot of Mt. Li, have a history of 6,000 years, the adjacent Huaqing Palace has a history of 3,000 years. Ranked among the Hundred Famous Gardens in China, it also has the status as a National Cultural Relic Protection Unit and a National Key Scenic Area.
 Daming Palace National Heritage Park, site of the former royal residence of the Tang dynasty emperors
Mount Li National Forest Park
Mount Zhongnan National Forest Park

Sports
Famous former professional sports teams in Xi'an include:
 Chinese Jia-A League
 Shaanxi National Power (moved to Ningbo and renamed themselves Ningbo National Power in 2004)
 Chinese Football Association Super League
 Shaanxi Baorong Chanba (moved to Guiyang and renamed themselves Guizhou Renhe in 2012)
 Chinese Basketball Association
 Shaanxi Dongsheng (moved to Foshan and renamed themselves Foshan Dralions in 2010).

Media

Television and radio
 China Central Television's channel 1 through 12 is broadcast nationwide.
 Shaanxi Television (SXTV) provincial station, broadcasts on eight channels as well as a satellite channel for other provinces.
 Shaanxi Radio broadcasts music, news.

International relations

Xi'an's twin towns and sister cities are:

References

Citations

Sources 

 .
 .
 .
 .
 .

External links

 Xi'an City Government official website 
 Xi'an National Hi-tech Development Zone
 Xi'an in Chinese history 

 
11th-century BC establishments in China
200s BC establishments
202 BC
Populated places along the Silk Road
Provincial capitals in China
Sub-provincial cities in the People's Republic of China
Populated places with period of establishment missing